The 2006–07 Luxembourg National Division was the 93rd season of top level association football in Luxembourg. The competition ran from 5 August 2006 to 30 May 2007.  F91 Dudelange continued their domination of the National Division by winning their third league title in a row; Dudelange also won the Luxembourg Cup to complete the Double.

Teams

The National Division was expanded from the 2005–06 season's complement of twelve teams to fourteen.  Those fourteen clubs were:

Format
Unlike in previous seasons, when a more complicated system was used, the 2006–07 season involved only a round-robin among the fourteen teams.  Thus, each team played 26 games over the course of the calendar.

European qualification
Luxembourg was assigned one spot in the first qualifying round of the UEFA Champions League, for the league champions; it was also assigned two spots in the first qualifying round of the UEFA Cup, for the runners-up and the Luxembourg Cup winners.  However, as F91 Dudelange won both the National Division and the Luxembourg Cup (as they had in 2005–06), the UEFA Cup spot for the Luxembourg Cup winners went to the losing finalists, UN Käerjeng 97.

Pre-season predictions
At the beginning of the season, F91 Dudelange were widely predicted to successfully defend their title. Dudelange strengthened their first-team squad by signing Thierry Joly and Alexandre Lecomte, whilst also holding on to most of their existing players.  By comparison, Jeunesse Esch and Etzella Ettelbruck, Dudelange's closest challengers in 2005–06, have lost key players; Jeunesse captain Manuel Cardoni became player-manager of US Rumelange, whilst Etzella lost Patrick Grettnich to retirement, and both Luc Mischo and Marc Reuter to Racing FC Union Luxembourg.

Final standings

Results

Relegation play-off

As a result of their victory, FC Victoria Rosport remained in the National Division for the 2007–08 season.

Top goalscorers

Footnotes

Luxembourg National Division seasons
Luxembourg National Division, 2006-07
1